Cottus hispaniolensis is a species of freshwater ray-finned fish belonging to the family Cottidae, the typical sculpins. It is  found in France and Spain. It inhabits the Garonne river drainage. It reaches a maximum length of 10.5 cm. It prefers streams with clear, cool, moderate to swift water and stone substrate. This taxon was originally described as a subspecies of the European bullhead (Cottus gobio), C. g. hispaniolensis, and was formally described as a separate species from the European bullhead in 2005 by Jörg Freyhof, Maurice Kottelat and Arne W. Nolte.

References

Fauna of Spain
Cottus (fish)
Fish described in 1964